The 2021–22 LEN Champions League Final Eight is the concluding LEN Champions League tournament of the 2021–22 LEN Champions League season.

Venue

Qualified teams

Schedule
LEN has determined the schedule of the Champions League Final Eight that will be held in Belgrade between June 2 and June 4.

Bracket
5th–8th place bracket

All times are local (UTC+2).

Quarterfinals

5th–8th place semifinals

Semifinals

Seventh place game

Fifth place game

Third place game

Final

References

External links
, len.microplustiming.com

Final Eight
LEN